Nysson rusticus is a species of wasp in the family Crabronidae. It is found in North America.

Subspecies
These two subspecies belong to the species Nysson rusticus:
 Nysson rusticus rusticus Cresson, 1882
 Nysson rusticus sphecodoides Bradley, 1920

References

Crabronidae
Articles created by Qbugbot
Insects described in 1882